Charles Walter Congreve was Archdeacon of Armagh from 1738 until his death in 1777.

Congreve was born at Stretton, South Staffordshire and educated at Magdalen College, Oxford.  He was Vicar general of the diocese from 1746. In 1746 he published An absolute, indefeasible, hereditary right contrary to reason and Scripture, on  He was buried in Westminster Abbey.

Notes

18th-century Irish Anglican priests
Archdeacons of Armagh
Alumni of Magdalen College, Oxford
1777 deaths
Clergy from Staffordshire
People from South Staffordshire District